Sajad Nikparast (born 21 September 1986) is a visually impaired Paralympian athlete from Iran competing mainly in category F12 javelin events. Nikparast represented his country at the 2012 Summer Paralympics in London, where he won the silver medal in the javelin. In 2013 he took bronze at the 2013 IPC Athletics World Championships in Lyon.

Notes

External links
 

1986 births
Paralympic athletes of Iran
Athletes (track and field) at the 2012 Summer Paralympics
Paralympic silver medalists for Iran
Living people
Iranian male javelin throwers
Medalists at the 2012 Summer Paralympics
Paralympic medalists in athletics (track and field)
21st-century Iranian people
Medalists at the 2010 Asian Para Games
Medalists at the 2014 Asian Para Games
Medalists at the World Para Athletics Championships
Visually impaired javelin throwers
Paralympic javelin throwers